Mary Irene Colette Ellis ( McCrossan, 18 November 1935 – 11 July 2021), better known by the stage name Colette O'Neil, was a Scottish actress, noted for her various roles on British television.

Life and career
O'Neil was a semi-regular cast member of Coronation Street in the mid-1960s as Ruth Winter, and also made frequent guest appearances in series such as Z-Cars, Dixon of Dock Green, Adam Adamant Lives!, No Hiding Place and Softly, Softly. She was also a leading cast member in the drama series The Standard and The Spoils of War. 

She played the role of Eleanor, Duchess of Gloucester, in the BBC television version of The Wars of the Roses. 

In 1983 she appeared in Doctor Who in the role of Tanha in the serial Snakedance.

She latterly appeared in Taggart, Lovejoy, Hamish Macbeth, Heartbeat, Peak Practice, Holby City, Monarch of the Glen and Bad Girls.

Her film appearances were few, but included roles in Frankenstein Must Be Destroyed (1969), The Smashing Bird I Used to Know (1969), Dreams Lost, Dreams Found (1987), Wild Flowers (1989), and Mortdecai (2015).

She also appeared as Hannah Sempel, the "keeper of the keys", in the BBC Radio drama "McLevy" alongside Scottish actors Brian Cox and Siobhan Redmond.

O'Neil married Michael Ellis and had two daughters and one son. She died in Glasgow in July 2021, at the age of 85.

Radio credits

References

External links
 
 Colette O'Neil radio

1935 births
2021 deaths
Actresses from Glasgow
Scottish radio actresses
Scottish television actresses